Kvinge Peninsula is a snow-covered peninsula at the north side of Palmer Inlet terminating in Cape Bryant, on the east coast of Palmer Land, Antarctica. It was mapped by the United States Geological Survey in 1974, and named by the Advisory Committee on Antarctic Names for Thor Kvinge, a Norwegian oceanographer from the University of Bergen. Kvinge was employed by the Christian Michelsens Institutt and was a member of the International Weddell Sea Oceanographic Expeditions, 1968, 1969 and 1970.

References

Peninsulas of Palmer Land